Mason Rhys Warren (born 28 March 1997) is an English footballer who plays as a midfielder for Mickleover Sports. He played professionally for Rotherham United in 2016.

Club career
Warren was born in Doncaster, South Yorkshire and started his career with  Rotherham United, where he progressed from the youth team to sign a professional contract in May 2015. He was taken with the first team on the pre-season tour of Scotland and became a regular with the development squad before he was sent to NPL Division One South side Sheffield on a two-month youth loan deal. He was a prominent figure in the side making six appearances during his loan spell before he was recalled in early January 2016. In February 2016, he was loaned out again joining National League North side Harrogate Town on a one-month loan deal. After picking up the Player of the Month award for Harrogate during February, his loan was extended until April. He went on to make a total of eleven appearances for Town. Upon his return to Rotherham in April, he signed a new two-year contract extension until 2018.

In August 2016, he made his first team debut for Rotherham in the EFL Cup first round 5–4 defeat to Morecambe, completing the full ninety minutes. In October he was sent out on loan to NPL Premier Division side Grantham Town on a one-month loan deal. He only made one appearance for the club in a 1–0 win over Mickleover Sports. In December 2016 he was sent to NPL Premier Division side Matlock Town on a one-month youth loan. He only made two appearances for Matlock before returning to Rotherham in mid-January. In December 2017 Warren joined Gainsborough Trinity on a youth loan.

He was released by Rotherham at the end of the 2017–18 season, subsequently signing in August 2018 for Mickleover Sports, where he made his debut on 22 August at Gainsborough Trinity.

Career statistics

References

External links

1997 births
Living people
People from Rotherham
English footballers
Association football midfielders
Rotherham United F.C. players
Sheffield F.C. players
Harrogate Town A.F.C. players
Grantham Town F.C. players
Mickleover Sports F.C. players
National League (English football) players
Northern Premier League players